Alfredo Ricardo Pérez (10 April 1929 – 23 August 1994) was an Argentine football defender who played for Argentina in the 1958 FIFA World Cup. He also played for Club Atlético River Plate.

References

External links
FIFA profile

1929 births
1994 deaths
Argentine footballers
Argentina international footballers
Association football defenders
Club Atlético River Plate footballers
1958 FIFA World Cup players